Anna Thangi is a 1958 Indian Kannada-language film, directed by K. R. Seetharama Sastry and produced by T. S. Karibasaiah. The film stars B. Jayamma, B. Saroja Devi, Vidyavathi and Lakshmidevi. The film has musical score by G. K. Venkatesh. The film was a remake of 1957 Tamil movie Makkalai Petra Magarasi.

Cast
B. Jayamma as Malla's mother
B. Saroja Devi as Belli
Rajkumar as Malla
Vidyavathi as Girija, Malla's sister
K. S. Ashwath as Somanna Gowda
Balakrishna as Ramachandraiah
Narasimharaju as Kempa
M. N. Lakshmi Devi
M. Jayashree
Papamma
Shyamala
Eshwarappa
Ganapathi Bhat
R. N. Magadi
Comedian Guggu
Vasudeva Girimaji

Soundtrack
The music was composed by G. K. Venkatesh.

References

External links
 

1950s Kannada-language films
Films scored by G. K. Venkatesh
Kannada remakes of Tamil films
Films directed by K. R. Seetharama Sastry